Richard and Judy is the name informally given to Richard Madeley and Judy Finnigan, a British married couple who are both television presenters and columnists. They presented the daytime television programme This Morning from 1988 until 2001, and then hosted the daily chat show Richard & Judy from 2001 until 2009.

Marriage and family
Madeley and Finnigan met in 1982 when they worked on separate programmes for Granada Television. Both were married at the time. After divorcing their previous partners, the couple married in 1986 in Manchester. They have two children together, both born in Manchester: Jack Christopher (born 1986) and Chloe Susannah (born 1987).

This Morning

They hosted This Morning from its inception in 1988 until 2001. The series, a mix of celebrity interviews, household tips, cookery and phone-ins lasted approximately two hours each weekday morning on ITV. It first aired in October 1988 and was broadcast from the Albert Dock in Liverpool, although production moved to London in 1996. They were so closely associated with the show that the programme was often referred to as Richard and Judy, rather than This Morning.

Since leaving, Madeley has appeared on the show by himself, publicising his autobiography, and the couple joined the show's current presenters, Phillip Schofield and Holly Willoughby, on 5 October 2009, to celebrate its twenty first birthday. They returned to the programme for a one-off 25th birthday show.

Richard & Judy
In 2001, they quit This Morning, having been approached by Channel 4 to host a similar show, simply called Richard & Judy, shown for an hour in the early evenings.

The show was produced by Cactus TV, run by Jonathan Ross's brother Simon and his wife Amanda Ross. In February 2007, the couple publicly apologised live on air due to the discovery of a TV quiz phone scam regarding the daily phone in You Say We Pay, in which winners were selected early on but viewers were encouraged to continue calling the premium rate entry number. On the same show, Madeley and Finnigan took the decision to suspend the daily quiz until further notice. Later that week, the news media confirmed that police investigations would be pursued, meaning the couple could be subject to a police interview. Channel 4 have said that the scam may have been in force for two series of the show. The couple both denied being involved in the scam. The scam was revealed by the Mail on Sunday newspaper after it was sold the story through media publicist Jonathan Hartley.

The TV show also launched two ‘clubs’, the Richard & Judy Book Club and the Richard & Judy Wine Club, both of which are similar in style to those used by Oprah Winfrey. The book club featured literature by new and unknown writers. One book was reviewed each week and the winner, named "Read of the Year," was announced at an awards ceremony.

In July 2008, Finnigan underwent a knee operation and took a short leave of absence from the show in order to fully recuperate from the surgery. During this time, Madeley was joined by guest presenters Emma Bunton and Myleene Klass and presented one edition of the show on his own (Wednesday 23 July 2008). Madeley said of the show which he'd presented himself, that "it was probably one of the best shows I've ever shot, but without a doubt the best show I've ever watched".

In 2008, it was announced that their Channel 4 series which began in June would be the last for the programme, which ended on 22 August 2008. However, they signed a contract for a new primetime show on UKTV's new channel, Watch. Their new show still contained features such as the "Book Club" and "Summer Read".

Move to Watch
After seven years at Channel Four, Richard and Judy began hosting a topical prime-time chat show on UKTV's new digital channel, Watch. From 7 October 2008, Richard and Judy’s New Position was broadcast on weeknights at 8.00 pm. 200,000 people watched the first episode, with numbers declining to 53,000 for the second. Viewing figures consistently fell, eventually declining to 11,000 viewers; their Channel 4 programme had seen figures as high as 2.5 million. Consequently, on 8 May 2009 it was announced that the show would end in July, the presenters saying in a statement that viewers "simply couldn't find us".

Other work together
Both co-wrote their autobiography, Richard and Judy: The Autobiography, in 2002, published by Hodder & Stoughton.

Political views
Madeley has expressed strong support for the former British Prime Minister Tony Blair and applauded the Iraq War, claiming international law on the issue was "incredibly complicated". He has been described as a neocon, Blair's “self-appointed apologist”, and Blair's “yapping Pekingese”. Madeley has condemned the former Labour party leader, Jeremy Corbyn.

In an interview, Madeley named Cuban leader Fidel Castro as the person he most despises.

References in popular culture 

Richard and Judy are mentioned in the song "Away from Here", which was released by the British band The Enemy in 2007.

Notes

References
 Richard Madeley & Judy Finnigan Biographical notes, The Biography Channel, Retrieved 27 August 2007
 One of Us, Guardian Unlimited, Claire Phipps, 12 October 2000, Retrieved 27 August 2007

External links

British television talk show hosts
Married couples